Cevat Gürkan (10 September 1907 – 1984) was a Turkish equestrian. He competed in two events at the 1936 Summer Olympics.

References

1907 births
1984 deaths
Turkish male equestrians
Olympic equestrians of Turkey
Equestrians at the 1936 Summer Olympics
Place of birth missing